Gowd-e Konardan (also Romanized as Gowd-e Konārdān, Gowd-e Kenārdān, and Gowd Kenar Dan; also known as Kenardan, Konārdān, Kunardūn, and Kūnerdān) is a village in Mehregan Rural District, in the Central District of Parsian County, Hormozgan Province, Iran. At the 2006 census, its population was 54, in 14 families.

References 

Populated places in Parsian County